Arzu is a village and municipality in the Khachmaz District of Azerbaijan. It has a population of 1,249.

References

Populated places in Khachmaz District